Babington Macaulay Junior Seminary is a private co-educational school in Agunfoye-Lugbusi Village, Ikorodu, Lagos Nigeria. It is jointly owned by three Anglican dioceses in the Lagos Province – Lagos, Lagos West and Lagos Mainland, Church of Nigeria.

In 2003, it participated in a science competition against some other secondary schools in Nigeria, including Redeemer's International School, Effortswill High School, Supreme Education Centre, Caleb International School, Atlantic Hall and Grace High School.

The master plan for the school's campus was developed by A. T. Onajide Architects of Lagos.

BMJS's first principal was the then Ven. Akin Odejide, ably supported by Ven. Tunde Oduwole and host of senior tutors; Mr Itiolu, Mr Arabambi, Mr Alagbala, Mr Jolayemi, Mr Babarinsa, Mrs Oki, Ms Akinrenmi and so on. The current principal of the school is The Rev Cannon Dr. Bamidele Osunyomi Adesina (8 August 2018 – present). The school was awarded the best private school in Ikorodu in 2019

Principals 
The Rt.Revd Dr.Joseph Akinyemi Odejide (1996–2005)
Ven.OlaOluwa Adeyemi (2005–2017)
Ven.Tunde Oduwole (2017–2018)
The Revd'Canon Dr. Bamidele Osunyomi. (2018–present)

BRESCAG competition
BRESCAG is an abbreviation for the pioneer schools that participated in the competition ~ Babington Macaulay Junior Seminary, Redeemers International Secondary School, Efforts will School, Solid Foundation School, Caleb International, Atlantic Hall and Grace High School respectively. The competition started in 1998 and has held every year since then at different venues allowing students to find what they excel in, both educationally and in sports. Competition include sports, athletics, science competitions, arts and debate.

References

External links

Secondary schools in Lagos State
Education in Lagos
Schools in Lagos
Christian schools in Nigeria